Česlovas Laurinavičius (born September 16, 1952 in Klaipeda) is a Lithuanian historian and politologist, In 2003, he was the recipient of the Knight's Cross of the Order for Merits to Lithuania. Since 2001, he has served as the head of the Department of the 20th Century History at the Lithuanian Institute of History.

References

1952 births
Living people
20th-century Lithuanian historians
Lithuanian political scientists
Vilnius University alumni
Academic staff of Vilnius University
Knight's Crosses of the Order for Merits to Lithuania
21st-century Lithuanian historians